Gabriele Fabris (born April 28, 1988 in Gorizia) is an Italian football player who currently plays for Crociati Noceto.

References

1988 births
Living people
People from Gorizia
Italian footballers
Association football defenders
Treviso F.B.C. 1993 players
Rovigo Calcio players
A.S.D. Itala San Marco Gradisca players
Italian expatriate footballers
Expatriate footballers in Hungary
Kaposvári Rákóczi FC players
Italian expatriate sportspeople in Hungary
Crociati Noceto players
Footballers from Friuli Venezia Giulia